Hari Prasad Upreti is a Nepalese politician, belonging to the CPN (UML) currently serving as the member of the 2nd Federal Parliament of Nepal. In the 2022 Nepalese general election, he won the election from Sarlahi 3 (constituency)
Assumed chair of defence Minister in Coalition Government formed by Prime Minister Prachanda, January 2023.

References

Living people
Nepal MPs 2022–present
1967 births